Badgaon or Bargaon may refer to the following places in India:
 Bargaon, Kamrup, a village in Kamrup rural district, Assam
 Bargaon, Odisha, a village in Odisha
 Badgaon, Jalore, a village in Jalore district, Rajasthan
 Bargaon, Udaipur, a town in Girwa tehsil, Udaipur district, Rajasthan
 Badgaon Bandh, a village in Mavli tehsil, Udaipur district, Rajasthan
 Bargaon (archaeological site), a Harappan site in Saharanpur district, Uttar Pradesh
 Bargaon, Saharanpur, a village in Saharanpur district, Uttar Pradesh